Louis Bruce (17 December 1875 – 31 March 1958) was a British wrestler and one of the first Black London tram drivers. He competed in the men's freestyle heavyweight at the 1908 Summer Olympics.

Prior to research undertaken in December 2021, he was recorded under the name "Lawrence Bruce". His name was correctly identified as Louis Bruce, and that he was the first black Olympian to represent Great Britain (it was previously believed that sprinter Harry Edward, who competed in 1920, was the first Black Olympian to represent Britain).

Tram career
Bruce also appears on the London Underground map of black history produced by the London Transport Museum. Bruce was one of London's first black tram drivers and was selected to drive tram No.320, the personal tram of London United Tramways (LUT) manager Clifton Robinson. He got his licence to drive trams in 1900 and appears to have driven until at least 1922. He achieved the relatively senior rank of Inspector. During his time with LUT, Bruce boxed in company matches and performed in company entertainments as a dancer, ragtime singer and comedian.

Personal life 
Bruce was born Louis Bruce McAvoy Mortimore Doney, in Edinburgh in 1875, to Jane Elizabeth Doney. He had six older sisters. His father was not named on his birth certificate. Bruce grew up in Plympton with his grandmother and two aunts. Bruce married Ethel Elizabeth Dunn in September 1911. Bruce listed his father as a medical practitioner named William King Bruce on his wedding certificate. Ethel and Louis Bruce had a son named Dennis. By the 1930s, Bruce had moved to Sutton and owned a shop. Bruce died in 1958 with an estate valued at £5,897.

References

External links
 

1875 births
1958 deaths
Black British sportsmen
British male sport wrestlers
Olympic wrestlers of Great Britain
Wrestlers at the 1908 Summer Olympics
Transport for London